Adolph (Adolf) Murray (13 February 1751 – 4 May 1803) was a distinguished Swedish anatomist.

Biography

Adolph Murray was born on 13 February 1751 in Stockholm.
He was the youngest son of the Prussian-born preacher and theologian Andreas Murray (1695 - 1771).
His brothers were the professors Johann Philipp Murray (1726-1776) and Johann Andreas Murray (1740-1791), 
and the Bishop Gustaf Murray (1747-1825).

In 1764 Adolph Murray became a student in Uppsala, and soon became devoted to anatomy.
He was a pupil of Carl Linnaeus.
At the age of 19 his professor gave him permission to give public lectures on anatomy in Stockholm.
In 1772 he received his PhD from Uppsala.
Adolph Murray then undertook a foreign field trip, returning in 1776.
While he was away, he was appointed Professor of Anatomy and Surgery at Uppsala University.
Linnaeus had supported this appointment.
He was one of the university's most prominent teachers, and made valuable contributions to science.

Adolph Murray died in Uppsala on 4 May 1803.
He had been a firm royalist.  His son, Carl Adolph Murray, was to become American consul in Göteborg.

Bibliography

Murray published many papers on medical subjects.  His longer works include:

References
Citations

Sources

1751 births
1803 deaths
18th-century Swedish physicians
Age of Liberty people
Burials at Uppsala old cemetery